Accelerated phase chronic myelogenous leukemia is a phase of chronic myelogenous leukemia in which the disease is progressing. In this phase, 10 to 19% of the cells in the blood and bone marrow are blast cells (immature blood cells). In the accelerated phase, these leukemia cells grow quickly.

Symptoms 
Common symptoms include fever, bone pain, and swollen spleen.

Treatment 
Patients treated with imatinib, dasatinib, and nilotinib have shown meaningful rates of hematologic and cytogenetic response.

Prognosis 
Prognosis is very poor once chronic myelogenous leukemia reaches the accelerated phase; it behaves similarly to acute myeloid leukemia.

References

External links 
 Accelerated phase chronic myelogenous leukemia entry in the public domain NCI Cancer Dictionary

Chronic myeloid leukemia